Bear with Me is a point-and-click adventure game developed by Exordium Games. It is described as an "episodic noir adventure game", and was released in three episodes, first in August 2016, final in October 2017. A prequel, The Lost Robots, was released in July 2019. The game draws inspiration from film noir and features Amber and her friend - detective Ted E. Bear, who are set on an adventure to find Amber's missing brother Flint. Bear with Me: The Complete Collection, a compilation of the first three episodes, was released on PlayStation 4, Xbox One, Nintendo Switch, Linux, MacOS, and Microsoft Windows on July 9, 2019.

Reception

Bear with Me received generally positive reviews. Adventure Gamers, in a review for all three episodes, praised its story, art style and the well integration of puzzles, but criticized the slow movement speed, and the occasional frustration, giving it 3½ out of 5. Italian magazine The Games Machine gave it 7.9 out of 10, stating "Bear With Me is a nice, old-style point and click adventure, with logical and well designed puzzles, although not too challenging, and a story that blends humour and drama. Not a milestone in the genre, but adventure fans should give it a chance.".

Episode 1
Hardcore Gamer was less positive in its review for the first episode of the series, arguing "The first episode of Bear With Me still hints at a greater game to come, nicely setting a proper noir tone with some occasional creepy bits and a gleeful dose of snark throughout.", but "it sadly says a lot that the initial outing feels more like a demo for the game than an actual full-fledged chapter of the story." LeveL magazine, on the other hand, gave it 8/10 and praised it as "The first episode of a dark adventure, where childlike elements are mixed with an adult story in a perfect harmony of a noir story".

Bear with Me: The Complete Collection

Bear with Me: The Complete Collection was published on July 31, 2019 for Xbox One, PlayStation 4, Nintendo Switch, and Microsoft Windows.

References

External links 
 Bear with Me website

2016 video games
Indie video games
Episodic video games
Detective video games
Monochrome video games
Point-and-click adventure games
Video games about bears
Fictional teddy bears
Linux games
MacOS games
Windows games
Video games developed in Croatia
Nintendo Switch games
Single-player video games